Trichodothis is a genus of fungi in the family Venturiaceae.

References

External links
Trichodothis at Index Fungorum

Venturiaceae